James McCormick (3 November 1856 – 10 March 1918) was a Scottish right-handed pitcher in Major League Baseball. A native of Glasgow (he was actually born outside the Glasgow boundary, in Thornliebank, Renfrewshire), he was the first ballplayer born in Scotland to appear in a major league game.

McCormick was great friends with Mike "King" Kelly and was also very well liked by Cap Anson, two of the great personalities of early baseball. Anson was McCormick's captain-manager in 1885 and 1886, when Chicago won its last 19th-century pennants.

Career
In Paterson, New Jersey starting in 1885, McCormick co-owned a bar with a fellow former local player, Dave Treado. It had a ticker, to post results of games and races. Before the 1888 season and probably at other times, Kelly did some bartending for him. That August, when McCormick's wife Jennie died, Kelly wired a former mutual Chicago teammate, and "telegraphed Mr. Joseph Towell, the [Paterson] florist, to get up something handsome, and this consisted of `The Gates Ajar,' the sides of which were made from nephetos [presumably nepetas, aromatic herbs in the mint family] and white roses, the base of carnations, yellow roses and white lilies. The gates were made of ivy leaves, the whole being surmounted by a dove."

Back in 1885, after their Chicago team won the pennant, Kelly and McCormick returned by train to Paterson with teammate Tom Burns, who was heading to Connecticut. A local social club met the players and took them to McCormick's bar. There, a state senator handed a silver ball to McCormick, "who was loudly called upon and cheered. He said he was suffering from the effects of a severe cold and he would like to make a speech but even if he did he could not tell them how much he appreciated this token of friendship, more than anything he had ever yet received. Kelly was called on and was cheered; in fact, the crowd at this stage was prepared to cheer everybody. As he arose some one [sic] called: 'Make a dead hit this time, Mike!' He said on behalf of Mr. McCormick and himself he desired to thank the donors of the ball; they would never forget this occasion and would ever keep this gift and try to be in the best club [sic]; but we are getting pretty old now."

About Anson, McCormick reportedly said the following in 1887, soon after being sold by Chicago to Pittsburgh: "Before I played ball with Anson I used to think he was a big dub, but I thought him a pretty fair fellow afterward. He never said much to me. If any one wants to get Anson mad let him say he is in one of those trances [presumably, mellow moments during a game]. Kelly used to make him wild by shouting in from the outfield: 'Have you got them again?'"

That offseason, Chicago President Albert G. Spalding sold several of his best-known players, mainly for drinking during the 1886 season. After selling George Gore to New York and Kelly to Boston, he traded McCormick. In March, McCormick was still the property of Chicago when Spalding said "the only trouble between McCormick and the club has been a difference of opinion between him and me as to his habits. Anson is and always has been very partial to 'Mac,' and wants him this season." Ten days later in Louisville, Anson said, "I desire his services very much, however, for I think that, under the new [pitching] rules [allowing for unrestricted overhand throwing], he will be the best pitcher on the diamond. If he is released, it will only be for a good sum of money." About a week after that, Spalding sold him.

He also served as a player/manager for the Cleveland Blues from 1879-1880 and 1882 with a 74–96 record.

At 16th all-time, McCormick has the 2nd highest Jaffe Wins Above Replacement Score (JAWS) of any eligible pitcher of any player not in the Baseball Hall of Fame.
Likewise, he has the highest Baseball-Reference WAR of any eligible player not in the hall of fame who is not otherwise held back by a scandal.

Death
He died in Paterson, New Jersey at the age of 61, and is interred at Laurel Grove Memorial Park in Totowa, New Jersey.

Highlights
He helped the White Stockings to win the 1885 and 1886 National League pennants.
Led the National League in walks allowed (74) and losses (40) in 1879.
Led the National League in wins (45), games pitched (74), innings pitched (657), games started (74), complete games (72) and batters faced (2,669) in 1880.
Led the National League in hits allowed per 9 innings pitched (8.28) and complete games (57) in 1881.
Led the National League in wins (36), games (68), innings (595), games started (67), complete games (65) and batters faced (2,412) in 1882.
Led the National League in earned run average (1.84) and winning percentage (.700) in 1883.
Led the Union Association in ERA (1.54), hits per 9 innings (6.47) and shutouts (7) in 1884.

Ranks 33rd on the MLB all-time ERA list (2.43).
Ranks 36th on the MLB all-time wins list (265).
Ranks 28th on the MLB all-time walks per 9 innings list (1.58).
Ranks 33rd on the MLB all-time innings list (4,275).
Ranks 99th on the MLB all-time strikeouts list (1,704).
Ranks 49th on the MLB all-time games started list (485).
Ranks 11th on the MLB all-time complete games list (466).
Ranks 87th on the MLB all-time shutouts list (33).
Ranks 32nd on the MLB all-time batters faced list (16,884).

See also

 List of Major League Baseball career wins leaders
 List of Major League Baseball annual ERA leaders
 List of Major League Baseball annual wins leaders
List of Major League Baseball player-managers

References

External links

Jim McCormick MLB Pitcher - Baseballbiography.com
Retrosheet
Howard W. Rosenberg, Cap Anson 1: When Captaining a Team Meant Something: Leadership in Baseball's Early Years, Cap Anson 2: The Theatrical and Kingly Mike Kelly: U.S. Team Sport's First Media Sensation and Baseball's Original Casey at the Bat, and Cap Anson 4: Bigger Than Babe Ruth: Captain Anson of Chicago (Arlington, Virginia: Tile Books, 2003, 2004 and 2006) 

1856 births
1918 deaths
Major League Baseball pitchers
19th-century baseball players
Indianapolis Blues players
Cleveland Blues (NL) players
Cincinnati Outlaw Reds players
Providence Grays players
Chicago White Stockings players
Pittsburgh Alleghenys players
Sportspeople from Glasgow
Major League Baseball players from the United Kingdom
Major League Baseball players from Scotland
Scottish baseball players
National League ERA champions
National League wins champions
Scottish emigrants to the United States
Columbus Buckeyes (minor league) players
Indianapolis Blues (minor league) players
Major League Baseball player-managers
Cleveland Blues (NL) managers